Jennat Rudbar (also Romanized as Jennat Rūdbār) is a village in Jennat Rudbar Rural District, in the Central District of Ramsar County, Mazandaran Province, Iran. At the 2006 census, its population was 191, in 77 families.

References 

Populated places in Ramsar County